Simon Ainsley Johnson (born 9 March 1983) is an English football coach and former professional player who played as an attacking midfielder.

Playing career
Johnson was born in West Bromwich and attended Stuart Bathurst Catholic High School. He left in Year Nine and moved to Leeds to start his career at Leeds United, where he was recognised as a tenacious and skilful target man. He signed his first professional contract at Elland Road in July 2000, but with a number of strikers ahead of him in the pecking order, he was restricted to reserve team football and did not make his senior debut until he was loaned to Hull City. In his first match for the Tigers, on 13 August 2002 at Bristol Rovers, he was brought on as a substitute and scored an 85th-minute equaliser which secured a 1–1 draw. Late in the 2002–03 season he made his Premier League debut for Leeds in the 6–1 defeat of Charlton Athletic, replacing Alan Smith. Over the next two seasons, Johnson only made sporadic appearances for Leeds and was loaned to several clubs for first team experience. He had also studied at Boston Spa Academy during his time in the Leeds United Academy.

In June 2005, he left Leeds and signed for Darlington on a free transfer where he enjoyed regular first team football, but fell out of favour under manager Dave Penney after nearly signing for Wycombe Wanderers. He joined Hereford United on 8 August 2007, initially on a short-term contract, which was later extended. In his first season at Edgar Street he was used mainly as a winger and made little impact until he scored a last minute equaliser against Wycombe in December 2007. He made his first league start of the season in the following match, and featured regularly for the remainder of the season as Hereford won promotion to League One. He notably scored an inspirational winner in the FA Cup against Tranmere Rovers, to send Hereford into the Fourth Round for the first time in 16 years. He left the club by mutual consent on 21 April 2009.

He was at Bury on a three-month deal. Johnson made his debut as late substitute in a 3–0 loss to AFC Bournemouth. On 12 September 2009, the club website announced that his month-to-month contract had been terminated.

He subsequently played for Halesowen Town and Solihull Moors, before joining his fourth club of the 2009–10 campaign, Guiseley. After a spell in Malta with Hibernians, he rejoined Solihull Moors, initially on loan from Guiseley. He finished his career with Hinckley United and Hinckley, before coming out of retirement to play one FA Vase match for Highgate United while he was manager.

Coaching career
Johnson was appointed manager of Midland League club Highgate United in July 2021. He left the club in January 2022.

Career statistics

Honours
Hereford United
Football League Two third place: 2007–08

Guiseley
Northern Premier League Premier Division: 2009–10
Northern Premier League Peter Swales Shield: 2009–10

References

External links
Official Hereford United profile
Halesowen Town profile

1983 births
Living people
Sportspeople from West Bromwich
Association football midfielders
English footballers
Leeds United F.C. players
Hull City A.F.C. players
Blackpool F.C. players
Sunderland A.F.C. players
Doncaster Rovers F.C. players
Barnsley F.C. players
Darlington F.C. players
Hereford United F.C. players
Bury F.C. players
Hibernians F.C. players
Hinckley United F.C. players
Guiseley A.F.C. players
Solihull Moors F.C. players
Halesowen Town F.C. players
Hinckley A.F.C. players
Highgate United F.C. players
Premier League players
English Football League players
English football managers
Highgate United F.C. managers
People educated at Stuart Bathurst Catholic High School
People educated at Boston Spa Academy